A.S.D. Penne Calcio is an Italian association football club located in Penne, Abruzzo. They currently play in the Italian Eccellenza.

External links
 Official homepage

Association football clubs established in 1920
Football clubs in Abruzzo
1920 establishments in Italy